Albirex Niigata Singapore FC, abbreviated as Albirex Niigata (S), is a Singaporean football club that plays in the Singapore Premier League. The club is a satellite team of Albirex Niigata of Japan.

History
Albirex Niigata Singapore, a satellite team of Japanese club Albirex Niigata, joined the S. League in 2004. It was in that year the Football Association of Singapore decided to invite foreign teams in the league in a bid to deal with poor attendance issues. For the first years of the club's participation in the league it has settled in the mid-table in the standings.

In 2008, Daisuke Korenaga became chairman of the club who introduced reforms in the club in order to improve its standing in the league. Among these was to secure sponsorship from Japanese companies with presence in Singapore, with the club having as many as 50 sponsors and improved fan engagement by setting up a Cheer Dance School and an academy. The club then improved its league performance finishing 7th in the 2008 season, 3rd in the 2012 season and as champions in the 2016 season. The club did not lose a match in their 2018 season.

Squad registration rule 
Albirex Niigata Singapore has a different squad registration rule compared to the other team. Below are the rule for squad registration for the season 2021:

 Albirex are required to have a squad size of at least 18 players, with a maximum of 25.
 Albirex are required to register at least four U-23 players (born on or after 1 January 1998) of Singaporean nationality for a squad size of up to 23 players; this increases to five for a squad of 24 or 25 players. At least two players of Singaporean nationality have to be fielded throughout the entire first half of any match.
 A maximum of two players of Singaporean nationality, without age restrictions, can be registered.
 Albirex are required to register at least eight U-21 players (born on or after 1 January 2000) of Japanese nationality for a squad size of up to 24 players; this increases to nine for a squad of 25.
 minimum of eight U-23 players (born on or after 1 January 1998) of Japanese nationality is also required for a squad of between 23 to 25 players.
 A maximum of one player of Japanese nationality, without age restrictions, can be registered.

Affiliated clubs
The following clubs are affiliated with Albirex Niigata FC (Singapore):
  Albirex Niigata Singapore Ladies (Women's Premier League)
  Albirex Niigata (J1 League)
  Albirex Niigata Ladies (WE League)
  Japan Soccer College (Hokushinetsu Football League)
  Albirex Niigata Barcelona (Quarta Catalana)

Sponsors

 Main Sponsor: Denka
 Kit Supplier: Mizuno Corporation

Players

Men's team

 

O23
JPN O23
O23

Women's team

 

 Head coach: Nahar Daud
 GK coach: Quek Jun Ming Bryan
 Team manager: Tyrus Soo
 Team manager assistants: Koh Mui Tee; Dominic Wong
 Sport trainer: Nithiya R.
 Sport trainer assistants: She Xin Yu; Palma Julia Nicole Mallabo

Former players
This section contains a list of former players who have either played 100 league games for the club, gone on to represent their nation, or played in the JLeague at any level.

 
 Issey Nakajima-Farran (2004–2006)
 Arata Izumi (2005)
 Yoshitaka Komori (2009)
 Akira Takase (2007–2009)
 Taisuke Akiyoshi (2008–2009)
 Ryota Kobayashi (2008–2009)
 Takasuke Goto (2009)
 Shota Matsuoka (2009–2010)
 Atsushi Shimono (2009–2012)
 Bruno Suzuki (2010–2011)
 Shuhei Hotta (2011–2014)
 Toshikazu Soya (2012)
 Masahiro Ishikawa (2013)
 Kento Nagasaki (2013–2017)
 Atsushi Kawata (2015–2016)
 Yōsuke Nozawa (2015–2018)
 Shunkun Tani (2016)
 Shuto Inaba (2016–2017)
 Hiroyoshi Kamata (2016–2020)
 Takuya Akiyama (2017)
 Tsubasa Sano (2017)
 Yasutaka Yanagi (2017)
 Wataru Murofushi (2018)
 Kenta Kurishima (2020)
 Kosuke Chiku (2021)
 Takahiro Koga (2021–2022)
 Daichi Omori (2022)
 Ilhan Fandi (2022)
 Kodai Tanaka (2022)

Managers
 Bogdan Brasoveanu (2004–2010)
 Koh Mui Tee (2011–2013)
 Yeo Junxian (2014–2015)
 Koh Mui Tee (2016–)

Head coaches
 Hiroshi Ohashi (2004)
 Otsuka Ichiro (2005–2006)
 Hiroaki Hiraoka (2007–2008)
 Naoki Naruo (2009)
 Koichi Sugiyama (2010–2013)
 Tatsuyuki Okuyama (2014–2015)
 Naoki Naruo (2016)
 Kazuaki Yoshinaga (2017–2018)
 Keiji Shigetomi (2019–2021)
 Kazuaki Yoshinaga (2022–)

Team staff

Honours

League
 Singapore Premier League: 5
 2016, 2017, 2018, 2020, 2022

Cup
 Singapore Cup: 4
 2015, 2016, 2017, 2018
 Singapore League Cup: 4
 2011, 2015, 2016, 2017
 Singapore Community Shield: 4
 2016, 2017, 2018, 2023

References

External links
 Albirex Niigata Singapore website
 S.League website page on Albirex Niigata Singapore 

 
Foreign teams in Singapore football leagues
Expatriated football clubs
Association football clubs established in 2004
Albirex Niigata
2004 establishments in Singapore
Singapore Premier League clubs